Tumbledown Dick may refer to:

 Richard Cromwell, who earned "Tumbledown Dick" as a nickname after abruptly falling from power
 The Tumbledown Dick, a former pub in Farnborough, Hampshire, England
 Tumbledown Dick, a 1736 play by Henry Fielding
 Tumbledown Dick, a book by Howard Spring